Barna may refer to:

People
Barna (name)

Places

Australia
Barna, South Australia, a locality

Croatia
, a village in Bjelovar-Bilogora County
Velika Barna, a village in Bjelovar-Bilogora County

Ireland
Barna, a village in County Galway, Ireland
Barna GAC, a Gaelic Athletic Association club based in Barna, County Galway, Ireland
Barna Woods, an area of mixed broadleaf woodland located in County Galway, Ireland

Italy
Cima de Barna, a mountain in the Lepontine Alps on the Swiss-Italian border
, a village in Plesio, Italy

Hungary
Bárna, Hungary

Romania
Barna, a village in Parincea Commune, Bacău County
Barna River, a tributary of the Someşul Cald
Bârna, a commune in Timiș County

Spain
Barcelona: locals call the city Barna, not Barça, which is mistakenly used by some foreigners (and refers to FC Barcelona).

See also
A nickname for Barcelona
The Barna Group, public opinion research company founded by George Barna
Barilius barna, a fish in genus Barilius of the family Cyprinidae